The following lists events that happened during 1976 in Rhodesia.

Incumbents
 President: John Wrathall (starting 31 December)
 Prime Minister: Ian Smith

Events

June
 23–24 June – B.J. Vorster, Prime Minister of South Africa and Henry Kissinger, United States Secretary of State, hold talks in West Germany over the Rhodesian issue.

August
 8 August - Operation Eland, aka the Nyadzonya Raid, is launched into Mozambique by the Selous Scouts
 11 August - Umtali came under rocket attack and mortar attack from Mozambique in retaliation for Operation Eland. Houses were damaged in Greenside and Darlington.

September
 24 September - The Rhodesian Government accepted proposals put forward by U.S. Secretary of State, Dr. Henry Kissinger for majority rule in Rhodesia within two years.

November
 15 November - 31 guerillas killed by Rhodesian Security Forces in a battle in the Honde Valley

December
 6 December - A retired Catholic bishop, a Catholic priest and a Catholic nun were shot dead in a guerrilla ambush in Lupane. They were 71-year-old retired Bishop of Bulawayo, Rt. Rev. Adolph Schmitt, 65-year-old Fr Possenti Weggarten, principal of Regina Mundi Secondary School in Lupane, and Sr Maria Frances van den Berg.
 19 December - 27 male workers killed by guerillas at a tea estate in the Honde Valley.

Unknown
Robert Mugabe and Joshua Nkomo form the Patriotic Front

Births
 6 July - Bobby Skinstad - former South Africa National Rugby Team captain

Deaths
 6 December - Retired Catholic bishop of Bulawayo, Rt. Rev. Adolph Gregory Schmitt, aged 71. Shot by guerillas in Lupane

Bibliography
 (1978). "The Valiant Years." Galaxie Press, Salisbury, Rhodesia

References

 
Years of the 20th century in Zimbabwe
Zimbabwe